Texas Roller Derby (TXRD), formerly known as Texas Lonestar Rollergirls, is a banked-track roller derby league based in Austin, Texas. Founded in 2001, TXRD is one of several leagues considered responsible for the modern roller derby revival. It is skater owned and operated. In 2006, the skaters of TXRD were featured in a 13-episode television series on A&E titled Rollergirls, which contributed to the renewed international popularity of women's roller derby.

Notably, TXRD is the only banked-track league to allow both fighting and a penalty wheel. Both are real and unscripted.

Teams

TXRD features six home teams plus a travel team: 
 The Hellcats
 The Putas Del Fuego
 The Holy Rollers
 The Rhinestone Cowgirls
 The Cherry Bombs
 The Hired Gun$
 The All-Scar Army Airborne Division

Calvello Cup
Roller derby performer Anne Calvello, the "Demon of the Derby", was an inspiration to the founding members of TXRD. They maintained a close correspondence with her in the early years of the league, finally meeting her in person in 2005 during the filming of the A&E show Rollergirls. The Championship Cup has been named in her honor.

List of finals

Performances by team

Penalty Wheel and Spank Alley

Rather than having skaters accumulate minor penalties throughout the game, as in other rule sets, skaters who have earned minor penalties are assigned a penalty through a spin of the penalty wheel. The penalties themselves have evolved throughout the years from entertainment-only penalties to a mix of entertainment and point-loss penalties to solely point-loss penalties.
Current penalties include:
 Long Jump
 Pillow Fight
 Arm Wrestling
 No Holds Barred, Two Lap Duel
 Tug of War
 Push Cart
 Relay Race
 Judge's Choice*

 *The Judge's Choice penalty is chosen by 11 fans seated in Spank Alley. Spank Alley seats are reserved for the winner of raffle tickets sold to fans throughout the game.

As part of TXRD's larger community outreach and philanthropy program, proceeds from the sale of Spank Alley tickets are donated to a trust for the son of the original Penalty mistress, Amber Diva, who died in 2003.

In popular culture
Skaters and fans from TXRD were featured in the 2002 video for Nashville Pussy's "Say Something Nasty".

In 2006, A&E produced the 13-episode series Rollergirls, featuring the personalities and games of the 2005 season. The show focused primarily on the lives of Cha Cha and Venis Envy of the Putas Del Fuego; Punky Bruiser, Miss Conduct, and Sister Mary Jane of the Holy Rollers; Lunatic and Clownsnack of the Hellcats; and Lux of the Rhinestone Cowgirls. Many other skaters were highlighted.

Also in 2006, TXRD skaters Lux and Venis Envy were featured in the music video for The Flaming Lips single The W.A.N.D. on the album At War with the Mystics.

Hell on Wheels, a documentary about the creation of the all-female roller derby league in Austin, Texas, in 2001 that sparked the modern derby revival premiered in March 2007 at the South by Southwest Film Festival. It focuses on the revival of the game via the original organization from which both TXRD Lonestar Rollergirls (banked-track) and Texas Rollergirls (WFTDA flat track) arose.

Released in October 2009, the film Whip It! based on a book by former LA Derby Dolls skater Shauna Cross featured both the league (in name) and the Holy Rollers (in name). Two TXRD skaters, Sacralicious of the Cherry Bombs and Rocky Casbah of the Cherry Bombs, provided stunt work and cameos along with other skaters from across the country.

Beginning February 2011, TXRD Lonestar Rollergirls bouts will be broadcast on central Texas television channel KCWX.

The TXRD Lonestar Rollergirls were featured in the 2012 Australian documentary film This Is Roller Derby.

Nokia Lumia's 920 ad campaign video competition in spring 2013 featured skaters from the Hellcats in a cameraphone comparison video.

The 2013 BBC program How to Build a Planet, hosted by Richard Hammond, featured TXRD Rollergirls in Episode 2, "Engineering a Universe". Skaters demonstrated principles of astrophysics and their effect on heavenly bodies in the creation of a solar system.

TXRD bouts are no longer aired on KCWX, but are streamed via their TXRD Facebook page, live on bout days.

In 2020, TXRD was featured on the Netflix series Home Game, a docuseries profiling unique and dangerous sports from around the world.

References

External links 
 

Roller derby leagues in Texas
Roller derby leagues established in 2001
Sports in Austin, Texas
2001 establishments in Texas